Philip Adrian Troy Goedluck (born 10 September 1967) is a male retired British bobsledder and athlete.

Bobsleigh career
He competed in the four man event at the 2002 Winter Olympics.

Athletics career
He represented England and won a bronze medal in the 4 x 100 metres relay event, at the 1994 Commonwealth Games in Victoria, British Columbia, Canada.

References

External links
 

1967 births
Living people
British male bobsledders
Olympic bobsledders of Great Britain
Bobsledders at the 2002 Winter Olympics
Athletes from London
English male sprinters
Commonwealth Games medallists in athletics
Commonwealth Games bronze medallists for England
Athletes (track and field) at the 1994 Commonwealth Games
Medallists at the 1994 Commonwealth Games